Paraclius is a genus of flies in the family Dolichopodidae.

Species

Synonyms:
Paraclius darwini Parent, 1933: synonym of Paraclius sexmaculatus Bezzi, 1928
Paraclius diplacocerus Capellari, 2013: synonym of Paraclius americanus (Schiner, 1868)
Paraclius formosus Parent, 1931: synonym of Tachytrechus longiciliatus (Van Duzee, 1931)
Paraclius maculifer Parent, 1939: synonym of Paraclius sexmaculatus Bezzi, 1928
Paraclius ovatus Van Duzee, 1914: synonym of Paraclius venustus Aldrich, 1901
Paraclius praedicans (Walker, 1860): moved to Pelastoneurus

References

Dolichopodidae genera
Dolichopodinae
Taxa named by Hermann Loew